Jowell is a surname. Notable people with the surname include:

 Sir Jeffrey Jowell (living), British barrister
Roger Jowell (1942–2011), British statistician and academic
 Tessa Jowell (1947–2018), British politician

See also
 Jowell & Randy, Puerto Rican reggaeton musicians
 Powell (surname)